Gmina Głogów is a rural gmina (administrative district) in Głogów County, Lower Silesian Voivodeship, in south-western Poland. Its seat is the town of Głogów, although the town is not part of the territory of the gmina.

Neighbouring gminas
Gmina Głogów is bordered by the town of Głogów and the gminas of Grębocice, Jerzmanowa, Kotla, Pęcław, Szlichtyngowa and Żukowice.

Villages
The gmina contains the villages of Borek, Bytnik, Grodziec Mały, Klucze, Krzekotów, Przedmoście, Ruszowice, Serby, Stare Serby, Szczyglice, Turów, Wilków and Zabornia.

References

Glogow
Głogów County